The Mayyas are a Lebanese all-female alternative precision dance group. The company has 36 dancers, and their routines are choreographed by Nadim Cherfan. The group's name means "the proud walk of a lioness" in Arabic.

In 2019, the Mayyas reached the semifinals of Britain's Got Talent: The Champions and took first place in Arabs Got Talent. They won season 17 of America's Got Talent in 2022. The Mayyas also received judge Sofía Vergara's Golden Buzzer of the contest.

Following the group's America's Got Talent win, they were praised on Twitter by Lebanese celebrities, as well as caretaker Prime Minister Najib Mikati, and the Lebanese army command. President of the Republic General Michel Aoun congratulated the group on their victory, saying they had "planted hope and light in all of our hearts". He also awarded them the Lebanese Order of Merit "in appreciation of the troupe's artistic performances and success".

The Mayyas performed alongside American singer Beyoncé at the opening of the Atlantis The Royal Dubai hotel in the United Arab Emirates.

References

External links

Lebanese female dancers
America's Got Talent winners
Recipients of the Order of Merit (Lebanon)